The Thirty-first Legislature of Albania, officially known as the X Pluralist Legislature of Albania, is the legislature of Albania following the 2021 general election of Members of Parliament (MPs) to the Albanian Parliament. The party of the Prime Minister Edi Rama, PS, obtained an absolute majority of 74 deputies, becoming the first party to win three consecutive terms since the fall of communism in Albania.

Composition of the Parliament

Election of chairperson

Procedure for election of the Chairperson of the Parliament

The procedure for the election of the Chairperson is foreseen by the Article 6 of Parliament's Rules which states that:

 A candidate for Chairperson of the Parliament shall be nominated by at least 15 deputies. An MP can not support more than one candidate. The proposal should be made with writing, contains the relevant signatures and is submitted to the Provisional Secretariat of Parliament.
 The Chairperson of the Parliament shall be elected without debate and by secret ballot, by majority vote, in the presence of more than half of all members of the Parliament. If none of the candidates has won the required majority, it is followed by a second round, where they vote for the two candidates that have received the most votes.
 Voting is publicly organized and chaired by a 5-member Voting Committee that reflects, as far as possible, the political composition of the Parliament. The oldest member by age also exercises the function of the Chairperson the Voting Committee and announce the voting results.
 The Speaker of the session immediately invites the elected Chairperson of the Parliament to take his place.

Inauguration day of the legislature

At 10:00 on September 10, 2021, the new X Legislature of the Albanian Parliament started in a session that was expected to be formal. The session was chaired by the oldest MP, who was Mrs. Luljeta Bozo from the ranks of the Socialists, who was elected for the first time as an MP at the age of 78. In the first plenary session, the Commission for the Verification of the Mandates of the Deputies was formed, consisting of 9 members (5 from the majority and 4 from the opposition). A second plenary session followed during the evening, at 17:00 from where the oath of the deputies mandated by the general elections of April 25, 2021 took place, followed by the election of the speaker of the new parliament.

The verification commission found 4 vacancies of deputies who had announced their resignation after being elected by the citizens and asked for their replacement with the deputies ranked after them according to the constituencies. From the ranks of the Socialists in the Tirana County, the seat of Najada Çomo was taken by Mimi Kodheli. In Durrës County, the seat of Lefter Koka was taken by Denis Deliu, while in Fier County, the seat of the former Speaker Gramoz Ruçi was taken by Mirela Pitushi. While from the ranks of Democrats in Lezhë County, Mark Marku was replaced by Elda Hoti.

The verification commission also divided the deputies according to the respective parties, since during the elections some parties participated under the banner of an alliance. Thus, the Socialist Party was confirmed with 74 deputies, as it entered the elections alone. The Democratic Party, which together with the allies won 59, in the new legislature will have 50 deputies under its banner. 4 deputies are from the ranks of the Socialist Movement for Integration, 3 from the Social Democratic Party, 3 from the Republican Party, 2 from the PDIU, 1 from the PAA, 1 from the LZHK and 1 PBDNJ. And the rest are MPs who have either decided to be independent or have been expelled from the parliamentary group, as is the case of former Democratic Party leader Sali Berisha, who was expelled just a day before the legislature from its party.

Only the Socialist Party, which was the winner of the elections, made a proposal for the post of the Chairman of parliament. The PS proposed Mrs. Lindita Nikolla.

While the biggest opposition party PD opposed Nikolla's as candidature with a preliminary decision taken in a party meeting and that then during the voting ends in the tearing of the ballot papers by each deputy in a demonstrative way.

Voting Sessions

The first voting session in parliament was chaired by the oldest member of the parliament, who was Mrs. Luljeta Bozo. After taking the oath, the MP, begin the session for the voting of the Speaker of Parliament, where the only candidate was Mrs. Lindita Nikolla who came from the ranks of the Socialists, thus becoming the 43rd Speaker of the Albanian Parliament.

{| class="wikitable" width="25%"
|+ Voting for Chairperson of the Parliament
! Pro !! Against !! Abstentions
|-
|bgcolor="#CCFFCC"| 79 votes ||bgcolor="#FFE8E8"| 4 votes ||bgcolor="#FFFFDD"| 0 vote
|-
|colspan="3" |Total of 137 votes, of which 54 invalid votes since they were torn before being thrown into the ballot box'.
|}

Six days later, on September 16, the presentation session of the governing program Rama III began, from where the Prime Minister himself and then each candidate for minister presented the objectives for the next four years. The session lasted over 20 hours postponing its closing for the following day. The third consecutive government of Rama was put to the vote on September 17, 2021, after a few days ago it had received the decree of President Ilir Meta. The new cabinet introduced consists of 12 women and only 5 men, making up 75 percent of government positions lead by women. This has propelled Albania to the top of global rankings in terms of the percentage of women holding Cabinet positions.

 Members of Parliament 
The following is a list of 140 members elected to the parliament in the 2021 Albanian parliamentary election. It consists of the representative's name, party, and they are divided according to the 12 constituencies of Albania to which they belong.

MPs
{| cellpadding="1" cellspacing="3" style="margin:3px; border:1px solid #000000;"
! colspan="3"|
|-
| 

Blendi Klosi
Bardhyl Kollçaku
Hatixhe Konomi
Nasip Naço
Fadil Nasufi

Lavdrim Krrashi
Aurora Mara

Jurgis Çyrbja
Milva Ekonomi
Lefter Koka
Ilir Ndraxhi
Edi Rama
Rrahman Rraja
Klodiana Spahiu
Alban Xhelili

Besion Ajazi
Taulant Balla
Luan Duzha
Saimir Hasalla
Evis Kushi
Florenc Spaho
Dasantila Tahiraj
Klevis Xhoxhi

Ismet Beqiraj
Erion Braçe
Lindita Buxheli
Bujar Çela
Antoneta Dhima
Petro Koçi
Tatiana Piro
Gramoz Ruçi
Baftjar Zeqaj

Bledar Çuçi
Laert Duraj
Mirela Kumbaro

Blerina Gjylameti
Niko Peleshi
Ilirian Pendavinji
Ilir Topi
Olta Xhaçka
Enslemvera Zake

Gerta Duraku

Shpresa Marnoj
Eduard Ndreca
Lindita Nikolla

Benet Beci
Edona Bilali
Paulin Sterkaj

Arben Ahmetaj
Belinda Balluku
Alqi Bllako
Luljeta Bozo
Klotilda Bushka
Najada Çomo
Etilda Gjonaj
Toni Gogu
Ogerta Manastirliu
Ulsi Manja
Arben Pëllumbi
Orlando Rakipi
Xhemal Qefalia
Eduard Shalsi
Elisa Spiropali
Ermonela Valikaj
Etjen Xhafaj
Fatmir Xhafaj

Anila Denaj
Damian Gjiknuri
Niko Kuri
Ilir Metaj
Teuta Ramaj
Pranvera Resulaj
Vullnet Sinaj
Anduel Tahiraj

| 

Kasëm Mahmutaj
Tomor Alizoti

Kreshnik Çollaku
Xhelal Mziu
Dhurata Tyli (Çupi)

Merita Bakiu
Oerd BylykbashiAgron Duka (PAA)Edi PalokaAndia Ulliri (PLL)Ferdinand Xhaferaj

Flutura Açka
Gazment Bardhi
Luçiano Boçi
Lefter Gështenja
Zheni Gjergji
Dashnor Sula

Enkelejd AlibeajNustret Avdulla (PDIU)Luan Baçi
Eralda Bano (Tase)
Ilda Dhori
Saimir Korreshi

Tritan Shehu

Seladin Jakupllari
Sorina Koti
Bledjon Nallbati
Ervin Salianji
Edmond Spaho

Isuf Çelaj
Flamur Hoxha

Agron Gjekmarkaj
Mark MarkuLindita Metaliaj (PR)Kastriot Piroli

Greta Bardeli
Helidon Bushati
Zef Hila
Emilja Koliqi
Ramadan Likaj

Lulzim Basha
Sali Berisha
Mesila Doda (PDIU)Vangjel Dule (PBDNJ)Grida DumaShpëtim Idrizi (PDIU)Belind KëlliçiFatmir Mediu (PR)Flamur Noka
Orjola Pampuri
Alfred Rushaj
Agron ShehajDashamir Shehi (LZhK)''
Jorida Tabaku
Albana Vokshi

Arbi Agalliu
Bujar Leskaj
Fation Veizaj
Ina Zhupa

| 

Monika Kryemadhi

Agron Çela

Erisa Xhixho
Petrit Vasili
| 

Gledis Çeliku
Meri Markiçi

Gertjan Deda
 Agron Çela defected from PLL to PS 
|}

See also 

Parliament of Albania
2021 Albanian parliamentary election

Note

References 

Legislatures of Albania